In telephony, call progress tones are audible tones that provide an indication of the status of a telephone call to the user.  The tones are generated by a central office or a private branch exchange (PBX) to the calling party.

Telecommunication equipment such as fax machines and modems are designed to recognize certain tones, such as dial tone and busy tone.

The ITU-T E.180 and E.182 recommendations define the technical characteristics and intended usage of some of these tones. ToneScript is a tone description format that may be used to specify the tone. Many European systems follow the recommendations of ETSI, European Telecommunications Standards Institute

Types
Busy tone (or busy signal)
Comfort tone
Conference call tone
Confirmation tone
Congestion tone
Dial tone
Disconnect tone
End of three-party service tone (three-way calling)
Executive override tone
Holding tone
Preemption tone
Queue tone
Recall dial tone
Record tone
Recorder warning tone
Reorder tone
Ringing tone, audible ringing
Ring tone, power ringing
Second dial tone
Special dial tone
Special information tone (SIT)
Stutter dial tone (used as a message-waiting indicator)
Zip tone (or Call waiting tone)

Regional and national standards
National telephone systems define tones to indicate the status of lines, equipment, or the result of calls with special tones. 

Such tones are generally standardized in each country, and may consist of single or multiple frequencies.

Most European countries have harmonised to a system of tones based on a single 425 Hz, while the United States uses a dual frequency system.

Exceptions exist, notably in private networks and on some VoIP equipment. In Europe, some countries maintain national exceptions based on established older standards and have not fully adopted ETSI recommendations. 

The most notable exceptions are found in the U.K. (distinct system of tones see table below), Ireland (British style ringback tone), Italy (non continuous dial tone) and France (tone frequencies at 440Hz).

Outside of Europe and North America, tone plans vary from country to country but are usually similar enough to be easily recognised by end users calling from abroad and by automatic dialling equipment, such as fax machines and modems.

Many countries have adopted plans similar to those recommended by the ETSI, others have influences of North American or British standards, while some like Japan and Australia are unique to those countries.

In many cases, when calling from abroad, busy, reorder and other call failure tones may be played by the local switch. Modern signalling protocols like SS7 send this information digitally, thus only a ringback tone or announcement generated by a distant switch in a foreign network will ever be heard by callers from other countries or networks.

Mobile phones roaming on a foreign network will often be provided with a ringback tone from the network they are temporarily hosted on. So, for example, calling a US phone in Europe may return a European ringback tone or visa versa. Increasingly, networks may opt to play their own domestic tones instead, making roaming seamless. In this case the ringing state is sent by the host network and the tone is generated by the home network.

In some instances, the tones are entirely generated by the local network or even by the telephone itself, this is increasingly common on VoIP based services. In this case no distantly generated tones will be heard.

The use of signalling protocols rather than audible tones means that a voice channel to the distant switch is unnecessary unless a call is connected. This saves network bandwidth, switch capacity and is often more user friendly as it can provide local tones or even on-screen feedback to end users.

North American tones

The tone frequencies, as defined by the Precise Tone Plan, are selected such that harmonics and intermodulation products will not cause an unreliable signal. No frequency is a multiple of another, the difference between any two frequencies does not equal any of the frequencies, and the sum of any two frequencies does not equal any of the frequencies. The frequencies were initially designed with a ratio of 21/19, which is slightly less than a whole tone. The frequencies may not vary more than ±1.8% from their nominal frequency, or the switching center will ignore the signal. The high frequencies may be the same volume as – or louder than – the low frequencies when sent across the line. The loudness difference between the high and low frequencies can be as large as 3 decibels (dB) and is referred to as "twist." The duration of the tone should be at least 537 ms.

ETSI guidelines (EU)

EU national exceptions to harmonised ETSI

UK tones

Australian tones
Supervisory tones in the Australian PSTN are defined in AS/CA S002, published by the Communications Alliance.

References

External links 
 Various Tones Used in National Networks (According to ITU-T Recommendation E.180)

Telephony signals